Brumhilda Ochs - Pachawo (born 1992, Windhoek, Namibia) is a Namibian model and beauty pageant titleholder who was crowned Miss Namibia 2014 and represented Namibia at the Miss World 2014.

Early life
Ochs is a student of Medicine at Unam School of Namibia. She was volunteering as A Model for AIDS Risk Reduction Model by Bupe.

Pageantry

Best Model of the World 2010
Ochs represented Namibia at Best Model of the World 2010 in Plovdiv, Bulgaria by Namibian Model Casting.

Miss Namibia 2014
Ochs was crowned as Miss Namibia 2014 represented Windhoek on August 2, 2014.

Miss World 2014
Ochs competed at Miss World 2014 in London, United Kingdom.

References

External links
Official Miss Namibia website

Living people
Namibian beauty pageant winners
Miss World 2014 delegates
1992 births
People from Windhoek